Marcia Joan Brown (July 13, 1918 – April 28, 2015) was an American writer and illustrator of more than 30 children's books. She has won three annual Caldecott Medals from the American Library Association, and three Caldecott Medal honors as an illustrator, recognizing the year's best U.S. picture book illustration, and the ALA's Laura Ingalls Wilder Medal in 1992 for her career contribution to children's literature. Many of her titles have been published in translation, including Afrikaans, German, Japanese, Spanish and Xhosa-Bantu editions. Brown is known as one of the most honored illustrators in children's literature.

Life
Brown was born on July 13, 1918 in Rochester, New York. She enrolled in the New York State College for Teachers, predecessor to the University at Albany. She taught at Cornwall High School in New York City. She left teaching to work in the New York Public Library's Central Children's Room. Her first book was The Little Carousel, a 32-page picture book that she both wrote and illustrated, published by Scribner's in 1946.

Brown lived with her companion Janet Loranger who was also her editor. Brown died on April 28, 2015 in Laguna Hills, California.

Awards
For her contribution as a children's illustrator Brown was U.S. nominee in both 1966 and 1976 for the biennial, international Hans Christian Andersen Award, the highest international recognition available to creators of children's books. She received the 1977 Regina Medal from the Catholic Libraries Association for "continued, distinguished contribution to children's literature without regard to the nature of the contribution" and the 1992 Laura Ingalls Wilder Medal from the American Library Association for "substantial and lasting contributions to children's literature"; it was then conferred every three years.

She received the Distinguished Alumni Award from the SUNY Albany Alumni Association (1969), the Distinguished Service to Children's Literature Award from the University of Southern Mississippi(1972), The Regina Medal from the Catholic Library Association for service to children's literature (1977).

From 1955 to 1983 Brown won three Caldecott Medals, the annual American Library Association award to the illustrator of the year's "most distinguished American picture book for children" (only David Wiesner has also won three). Her books have been named Honor Books six times from 1947 to 1954, and display silver rather than gold seals.

Selected works
Caldecott Medal winners
Cinderella, or the Little Glass Slipper, 1954 
Once a Mouse, 1961 
Shadow, 1982

Caldecott Honor finalist
 Stone Soup: An Old Tale, 1947
 Henry Fisherman, 1949
 Dick Whittington and his Cat, 1950
 Skipper John's Cook,1951
 Puss in Boots, 1952
 The Steadfast Tin Soldier, 1953

References

 

1918 births
American children's writers
American women illustrators
Caldecott Medal winners
American children's book illustrators
Laura Ingalls Wilder Medal winners
Writers from Rochester, New York
2015 deaths
Artists from Rochester, New York
University at Albany, SUNY alumni